Morris Park is a neighborhood and park on the western edge of the West Philadelphia section of Philadelphia, Pennsylvania, United States.

References

Neighborhoods in Philadelphia